Marin Čilić defeated Andy Murray in the final, 6–4, 7–5 to win the men's singles tennis title at the 2016 Cincinnati Masters. It was his maiden Masters 1000 title, ending a streak of 18 consecutive Masters events won by a member of the Big Four.

Roger Federer was the two-time reigning champion, but withdrew due to a knee injury.

Seeds
The top eight seeds receive a bye into the second round.

Draw

Finals

Top half

Section 1

Section 2

Bottom half

Section 3

Section 4

Qualifying

Seeds

Qualifiers

Lucky losers

Qualifying draw

First qualifier

Second qualifier

Third qualifier

Fourth qualifier

Fifth qualifier

Sixth qualifier

Seventh qualifier

References

Main Draw
Qualifying Draw

External links

Western and Southern Open
2016 Western & Southern Open